Hans Georg Jacob Stang (17 February 1858 – 11 September 1907) was a Norwegian military officer and politician from the Liberal Party. He served as the Norwegian Minister of Defence from 1900 to 1903.

References

1858 births
1907 deaths
Defence ministers of Norway